Weeding is the systematic removal of resources from a library based on selected criteria.  It is the opposite of selecting material, though the selection and de-selection of material often involve the same thought process.  Weeding is a vital process for an active collection because it ensures the collection stays current, relevant, and in good condition.  Weeding should be done on a continuous, ongoing basis. Educating the staff with workshops and presentations on collection quality, maintenance, and the importance and positive benefits of weeding the collection are important components for a library to consider.

Reasons to weed
A "well-maintained, well-pruned collection is far more useful than one filled with out-of-date or unused materials."  Weeding a physical collection has many benefits:
Space is preserved to add relevant materials.
Patrons are able to access useful materials quickly and the librarian can direct them to information more easily.
The collection is more reputable because it is current.
The librarian can easily see the strengths and weaknesses of the collection.
Materials are of good quality and in good physical condition.

With many collections having a digital component, space is not an issue for concern.  However, this does not mean digital collections should not be weeded.  "Clearing out unused materials makes a patron’s searching experience better by reducing the number of old and irrelevant records the patrons must wade through in their search results to find what they really want."  The digital collection, like the physical collection, should be current and easily accessible.

Weeding criteria
Weeding should be addressed in a library's collection development policy, and the criteria should be outlined.  The following list outlines some considerations for weeding resources.
Poor content
Content is outdated or obsolete.
Content is biased, racist, or sexist.
Content is irrelevant to patron needs (or not being used in a school's curriculum).
Content is too mature/immature for patrons (especially important for school libraries).
Poor condition
Resource has irreparable damage (torn pages, broken spines).
Resource is dirty or smelly.
Resource would not survive further circulation.
Poor circulation
Resource is not being used by patrons in a certain time frame.
Other considerations
Multiple copies that are not needed.
Enough resources on a particular subject.
Replacement of the item and the cost of replacing it.
Visual appeal of the item (including artwork).

Weeding issues
Weeding may be viewed as controversial by community members. John N. Berry III has discussed this in his essay, "The Weeding War". The controversial nature of collection weeding necessitates the educating of library staff. It provides them with "the tools they need to counter common perceptions or misperceptions regarding weeding", especially those encountered by faculty in an academic library.

References

Library management